Clara of Saxe-Lauenburg (13 December 1518 – 27 March 1576) was a Princess of Saxe-Lauenburg and Duchess of Brunswick-Gifhorn by marriage.

Life 
Clara was born on 13 December 1518 in Lauenburg upon Elbe, a daughter of Duke Magnus I of Saxe-Lauenburg (1470–1543) and his wife Catherine (1488–1563), daughter of Duke Henry I of Brunswick-Wolfenbüttel.

She married Duke Francis of Brunswick-Gifhorn (1508–1549) on 29 September 1547 in the Saxe-Lauenburgian castle at Neuhaus in Darzing. The couple were greatly loved by their subjects even if their short marriage of convenience was unlucky. Clara, who was very benevolent and went into medicine, used to prepared an herbal beer (Kräuterbier) for the poor and sick, which was produced long after her death.

Following the untimely death of her husband, Clara lived at the dower pledged to her as a life annuity in Fallersleben, where she finished building her castle in 1551 and presided over a boom in the local economy. Later she went to the court of her daughter in Barth, where she died on March 27, 1576. Clara was interred in St. Mary's Church there. Her tomb in the castle chapel in Gifhorn is empty.

Descendants 
Clara had two daughters from her marriage:
 Catherine (1548–1565)
∞ 1564 Burgrave Henry VI of Meißen (1536–1572)
 Clara (1550–1598)
∞ 1. 1565 Prince Bernhard VII of Anhalt (1540–1570)
∞ 2. 1572 Duke Bogislaw XIII of Pomerania (1544–1606)

Ancestry

References

Sources 
 Johann H. Steffens: Johann Henry Steffens Auszug aus der Geschichte des Gesammthauses Brunswick-Lüneburg, Bartsch, 1785, S. 381

External links 
 Clara of Saxe-Lauenburg-Ratzeburg 
 The Reformation in Lauenburg Land under Francis I of Saxe-Lauenburg 

1518 births
1576 deaths
People from Lauenburg (Elbe)
House of Ascania
Duchesses of Brunswick-Lüneburg
Duchesses of Saxe-Lauenburg
Converts to Lutheranism from Roman Catholicism
Middle House of Lüneburg
Daughters of monarchs